Morgan County Library may refer to:

Morgan County Public Library in Martinsville, Indiana
Morgan Library & Museum in Manhattan, New York City
The Morgan County Library, part of the Azalea Regional Library System